The Hon. William Howard (25 December 1781 – 25 January 1843) was an English politician who was a Conservative Member of Parliament for Morpeth (1806–32) and Sutherland (1837–40).

Early life and family
Howard was the second son of Frederick Howard, 5th Earl of Carlisle, and his wife, Lady Margaret Caroline Leveson-Gower, daughter of the 1st Marquess of Stafford.  His eldest brother, George, succeeded their father as the 6th Earl of Carlisle in 1825; his second eldest brother, Maj. Frederick Howard, was killed in action at the Battle of Waterloo; and his third brother, the Very Rev. Henry Howard, was Dean of Lichfield. He had six sisters, including Elizabeth, Duchess of Rutland.

Career
At age 24, Howard entered Parliament in 1806 as member for Morpeth, a pocket borough where his father controlled one of the two seats. He represented that borough until 1826, and again from 1830 to 1832, and was Conservative MP for the Scottish county constituency of Sutherland between 1837 and 1840.

References

 F W S Craig, British Parliamentary Election Results 1832-1885 (2nd edition, Aldershot: Parliamentary Research Services, 1989)

External links 
 

1781 births
1843 deaths
Younger sons of earls
William Howard
Conservative Party (UK) MPs for English constituencies
Members of the Parliament of the United Kingdom for Highland constituencies
UK MPs 1806–1807
UK MPs 1807–1812
UK MPs 1812–1818
UK MPs 1818–1820
UK MPs 1820–1826
UK MPs 1830–1831
UK MPs 1831–1832
UK MPs 1837–1841
Scottish Tory MPs (pre-1912)
Tory MPs (pre-1834)